The Minnie Stewart House, located at 1015 Euclid Ave. in Monmouth, Illinois, is the site of the formation of women's fraternity Kappa Kappa Gamma. The house was built by Judge James H. Stewart around 1865. Minnie Stewart, James' daughter and a student at Monmouth College in Monmouth, Illinois, founded Kappa Kappa Gamma in the house in 1870. Minnie and five other students planned the fraternity through meetings in the house. The group adopted the key as their symbol and ordered a set of gold key badges, which they wore upon the official announcement of the fraternity in October. 

The fraternity was one of the first Greek organizations for women in the United States; in fact, it predated the use of the term "sorority" by twelve years. Women had only recently gained the opportunity to pursue higher education, and the early women's fraternities such as Kappa Kappa Gamma sprang from women's desires to organize themselves socially as men did through fraternities. While the Monmouth chapter of Kappa Kappa Gamma shut down in 1884 after the college outlawed fraternal organizations, it has been reinstated and is currently active on the Monmouth Campus. The fraternity is still nationally prominent.

The house was added to the National Register of Historic Places on October 19, 1989.

The Kappa Kappa Gamma Foundation operates the house as a historic house museum, with the downstairs rooms furnished in a Victorian style.

References

External links
 The Stewart House Museum - Kappa Kappa Gamma Foundation

Houses on the National Register of Historic Places in Illinois
Italianate architecture in Illinois
Houses in Warren County, Illinois
Museums in Warren County, Illinois
Historic house museums in Illinois
National Register of Historic Places in Warren County, Illinois
Fraternity and sorority houses
Sorority houses
History of women in Illinois